Nidadavole Assembly constituency is a constituency in East Godavari district of Andhra Pradesh, representing the state legislative assembly in India. It is one of the seven assembly segments of Rajahmundry Lok Sabha constituency, along with Anaparthy, Rajanagaram, Rajahmundry City, Rajahmundry Rural, Kovvur and Gopalapuram. G.Srinivas Naidu is the present MLA of the constituency, who won the 2019 Andhra Pradesh Legislative Assembly election from Yuvajana Sramika Rythu Congress Party. , there are a total of 203,084 electors in the constituency.

Mandals 
The three mandals that form the assembly constituency are:

Members of Legislative Assembly

Election results

Assembly Elections 2009

Assembly elections 2014

Assembly elections 2019

See also 
 List of constituencies of the Andhra Pradesh Legislative Assembly

References 

Assembly constituencies of Andhra Pradesh